Hauswirth is a surname. Notable people with the surname include:

Christian Hauswirth (born 1965), Swiss ski jumper
Luke Hauswirth (born 1995), American soccer player
Sabine Hauswirth (born 1987), Swiss orienteering competitor